Paul Raven may refer to:
 Paul Raven (musician) (1961–2007), British bassist mostly known for his work with the punk/rock band Killing Joke
 Paul Raven, pseudonym of English musician Paul Gadd, better known as Gary Glitter
 Paul Raven (footballer) (born 1970), English football player

See also
 Paul (given name)
 Raven (surname)